JMEV is a joint venture headquartered in Nanchang, China, and owned by Groupe Renault (as a majority holder), Jiangling Motors Corporation Group (JMCG) and China Agricultural Development Construction Fund Corporation. JMEV is focused on the development and production of electric cars and was established in 2015 as a subsidiary of JMCG. It was reorganised as a joint venture in July 2019, after Renault acquired a majority stake.

History
In 2014, Jiangling Motors announced the creation of a branch centred on electric cars. On 15 January 2015, Jiangling Motors Corporation Group established a new subsidiary called JMEV. The first car produced by JMEV, the E100, entered production at a Nanchang plant that same year. In 2016, the company opened an electric vehicle test and development centre and started production of a new car, the E200. That year, it got certifications from the government to produce electric cars. In 2017, the company launched two models: the E160 and E200S. It also got permission to produce and sell cars independently of JMCG. In April 2018, the company began building a new production base at Kunming with the capacity to assemble up to 100,000 cars per year. That year, JMEV launched  the E400. In October 2019, the Kunming plant started producing EX5s.

In December 2018, French manufacturer Renault announced it would acquire a "significant" JMEV stake. In July 2019, Renault completed the acquisition of a 50% JMEV stake through capital increase while JMCG and China Agricultural Development Construction Fund Corporation kept a 37% and 13% respectively. The company was reorganised as a joint venture.

Models

Current

JMEV EV3 (previously E300)
A hatchback, equipped with a 35kW motor and a 32kWh battery.

JMEV EX5
A CUV, previously known as the E400 and is based on the Landwind X2. The E400 SUV was renamed as EVeasy EX5 in September 2019.

JMEV Yi (GSE)
A compact sedan with a 147 horsepower and an expected NEDC range of up to 400 km.

In September 2021, Renault announced the intention to market the Yi in Europe as a subscription-only vehicle for professional drivers as the Mobilize Limo.

Future
 JMEV Xiaoqilin

Previous

E100

The car has a 104 Ah lithium-ion battery pack. Its top speed is 100 km/h.

E160

E200
Suspension is made up of MacPherson struts on front and trailing arms on rear.

Versions with more powerful batteries (E200N) introduced in 2018 increased the vehicle range up to an estimated .

E200S

EVeasy models
EVeasy is a sub-marque introduced by JMEV at the 2018 Guangzhou Auto Show. Sales started in March 2019.

Other Jiangling-named new energy vehicles
Besides JMEV products, Jiangling Motors and Jiangling Motor Group sell their own new energy vehicles directly, including the S330 SUV and the T500EV pickup.

Branding
At first, JMEV vehicles used a similar badge logo as Jiangling Motors' Yusheng division. JMEV products either launched or updated from 2018 onwards adopted a lower case "e" letter as their badge logo.

Notes

References

Electric vehicle manufacturers of China
Companies based in Jiangxi
Vehicle manufacturing companies established in 2015
Renault
Jiangling Motors Corporation Group